Berberia lambessanus is a species of butterfly in the family Nymphalidae. It is endemic to the North African region, mainly Morocco, Algeria, and Tunisia. It flies in the vast steppes but has a preference for slopes, and the males are easily seen flying in search of a shy female.  Usually, females are fertilised as soon as they hatch.  The range of Berberia lambessanus overlaps with that of B. abdelkader

Flight period 
June to October, depending on altitude and locality.

Food plants
Larvae feed on Ampelodesmos mauretanica.

References

Satyrinae of the Western Palearctic
Michel Tarrier
Tennent, John, 1996; The Butterflies of Morocco, Algeria and Tunisia; 

Satyrini
Butterflies of Africa
Lepidoptera of North Africa